Joyasree Goswami Mahanta is an Indian politician. She was a Member of Parliament, representing Assam in the Rajya Sabha the upper house of India's Parliament as a member of the Asom Gana Parishad. She is an Assamese language writer and educationalist. She was awarded India's fourth highest civilian award the Padma Shri in 2018.

References

1960 births
Living people
Rajya Sabha members from Assam
Asom Gana Parishad politicians
Women in Assam politics
Recipients of the Padma Shri in literature & education
Women members of the Rajya Sabha
Recipients of the Sahitya Akademi Award in Assamese